Leslie Savage (16 March 1897 – 26 August 1979) was a British freestyle swimmer who competed at the 1920 and 1924 Summer Olympics. In 1920 he won a bronze medal as a member of the British team in the men's 4×200-metre relay, and competed in the semifinal of the 100-metre freestyle. In 1924 he swam the final leg in the first qualifying heat of the 4×200-metre relay event as a member of British team, but was later replaced by John Thomson in the semifinal and final. The British team finished in a fifth place.

See also
 List of Olympic medalists in swimming (men)

References

External links

Leslie Savage's profile at databaseOlympics

1897 births
1979 deaths
English male freestyle swimmers
Olympic bronze medallists for Great Britain
Olympic bronze medalists in swimming
Olympic swimmers of Great Britain
Swimmers at the 1920 Summer Olympics
Swimmers at the 1924 Summer Olympics
Medalists at the 1920 Summer Olympics